Maksim Alexandrovich Opalev (born 4 April 1979) is a retired Russian sprint canoeist. Competing in three Summer Olympics, he has won a complete set of medals in the C-1 500 m event (gold: 2008, silver: 2000, bronze: 2004).

Opalev's potential was evident when he won two gold medals as a sixteen-year-old at the 1995 World Junior Championships in Yamanashi, Japan. Competing against opponents two years older than himself he won the C-2 1000 m title (with Konstantin Fomichev) as well as the C-4 500 m gold. At the next edition of the world junior championships, in Lahti, Finland, in 1997, Opalev won the C-1 1000 m title.

At the ICF Canoe Sprint World Championships, Opalev has won 20 medals between 1997 and 2007. This includes eleven golds (C-1 200 m: 1999, 2002, 2003; C-1 500 m: 1998, 1999, 2001, 2002, 2006; C-1 1000 m: 1999, C-4 200 m: 2002, 2005), six silvers (C-1 200 m: 2001, 2005, 2007; C-1 500 m: 2003, C-1 1000 m: 2002, C-4 1000 m: 1997), and three bronzes (C-1 500 m: 2005, C-1 1000 m: 2003, C-4 200 m: 2001). Opalev also won two more medals at the 2003 world championships in Gainesville, Georgia, United States with golds in the C-4 200 m and C-4 500 m events, but were stripped of those medals when teammate Sergey Ulegin failed a doping test.

References

External links

1979 births
Living people
Canoeists at the 2000 Summer Olympics
Canoeists at the 2004 Summer Olympics
Canoeists at the 2008 Summer Olympics
Olympic canoeists of Russia
Olympic gold medalists for Russia
Olympic silver medalists for Russia
Olympic bronze medalists for Russia
Sportspeople from Volgograd
Russian male canoeists
Olympic medalists in canoeing
ICF Canoe Sprint World Championships medalists in Canadian
Medalists at the 2008 Summer Olympics
Medalists at the 2004 Summer Olympics
Medalists at the 2000 Summer Olympics